The men's lightweight (74 kilograms) event at the 2014 Asian Games took place on 30 September 2014 at Ganghwa Dolmens Gymnasium, Incheon, South Korea.

Schedule
All times are Korea Standard Time (UTC+09:00)

Results 
Legend
R — Won by referee stop contest
W — Won by withdrawal

Final

Top half

Bottom half

References

External links
Official website

Taekwondo at the 2014 Asian Games